Claudius Traunfellner (born 7 February 1965) is an Austrian conductor.

Life and career 
Born in Vienna, Traunfellner took violin lessons at the University of Music and Performing Arts Vienna, where he completed his studies in 1986. He had already obtained the artistic diploma for choral and ensemble conducting there in 1985. From 1987 to 1989, he studied conducting with Karl Österreicher at the University of Music and Performing Arts Vienna.

With this and other orchestras, the conductor has given numerous performances at home and abroad, in all the renowned concert halls in Austria as well as in the US, Canada, South America, Japan, Taiwan, France, Belgium, Germany, Denmark, Sweden, Italy, Spain, Poland, the Czech Republic, Slovakia, Greece.

Traunfellner is frequently engaged as a guest conductor by other orchestras.

Gallen, Rovereto, Stresa, Ferrara, Flanders, Rheingau Musik Festival, Mozart Festival Würzburg, the Carinthischer Sommer and the Schubertiade Vorarlberg. 

Among the opera productions Traunfellner has conducted in Vienna and Bregenz are Le nozze di Figaro, The Barber of Seville and La Cenerentola. Traunfellner's repertoire ranges from the baroque to the modern, with the conductor paying particular attention to works by Austrian composers. Traunfellner has recorded several CDs with the Vienna Chamber Philharmonic, the Vienna RSO and the Vienna Chamber Orchestra, including serenades, symphonies and concert arias by Mozart, Schönberg's Transfigured Night and numerous works by living Austrian composers.

References

External links 
 Kammerphilharmonie
 

Austrian conductors (music)
1965 births
Living people
Musicians from Vienna